Shubhi Sharma (born 27 March 1992) is an Indian actress who is active mainly in Bhojpuri-language films. She is known for her role in Chalni Ke Chaalal Dulha opposite Pravesh Lal Yadav, for which she received the award for Best Female Debut of the Year at the 5th Bhojpuri Film Awards.

Acting career
Sharma started her career with Pravesh Lal Yadav in Chalni Ke Chaalal Dulha. Her other notable films have included Bhaiya Ke Sali Odhania Wali with Pawan Singh, Santan with Ravi Kishan, and Chhapra Express with Khesari Lal Yadav.

Filmography

See also
 List of Bhojpuri cinema actresses
 Bhojpuri cinema
 Bhojpuri Film Award

References

Living people
Actresses in Bhojpuri cinema
Indian television actresses
Indian film actresses
21st-century Indian actresses
1992 births